Leeza Kim Gibbons (born March 26, 1957) is an American talk show host. She is best known as a correspondent and co-host for Entertainment Tonight (1984–2000) as well as for having her own syndicated daytime talk show, Leeza (1993–2000). In 2013, her book Take 2 became a New York Times bestseller and she won the Daytime Emmy for Outstanding Host in a Lifestyle or Travel program for the PBS show, My Generation. On February 16, 2015, Gibbons was named the winner of Celebrity Apprentice; while on the show she raised $714,000 for her charity Leeza's Care Connection.

Biography

Early life
Leeza Gibbons was born in Hartsville, South Carolina, the daughter of Jean and Dr. Carlos Gibbons. Gibbons has two siblings – a brother, Carlos Jr., and a sister, Cammy. Leeza Gibbons grew up in Columbia, South Carolina in a housing subdivision called Whitehall, and graduated from Irmo High School. After completing high school, Gibbons graduated summa cum laude from the University of South Carolina's school of journalism and mass communication. She was a member of the Delta Delta Delta sorority at the university.

Career

Leeza Gibbons's television career started at WSPA-TV in Spartanburg, South Carolina. Next she was the co host of PM Magazine for KFDM-TV in Beaumont, Texas, and then moved to sister station WFAA-TV in Dallas. The new position represented a major career step and came with media attention.

In 1983 Gibbons joined WCBS-TV in New York City, where she became a host on Two on the Town, a program modeled after PM Magazine. Her co-host was Robb Weller. The following year both of them joined Entertainment Tonight, with Gibbons as a reporter and co-anchor of the program's weekend edition.

In the early to mid-1990s, Gibbons partnered with Guthy-Renker becoming a trailblazer in the world of direct response. She was the first television star on a daily show to be featured in an infomercial as she starred in back-to-back blockbusters (Personal Power 2 and Get the Edge) with a young Tony Robbins.

Leeza was her own NBC/syndicated talk show; it ran from June 1993 to September 2000. The show originated as John & Leeza from Hollywood, with former Entertainment Tonight co-host John Tesh. Tesh was dropped from the show after seven months, and Gibbons was the host for the remainder of the series.

From 2001 to 2003, Gibbons was the host and managing editor of the television show Extra. Beginning in 2011, she was the host of the PBS talk show My Generation (2011–2014) and co-host and executive producer of the syndicated news magazine show America Now (2011–2015).

In the 1990s, Gibbons hosted the radio show Blockbuster Top 25 Countdown with Leeza Gibbons. She counted down the hits in Adult Contemporary and Hot Adult Contemporary formats, and presented  entertainment news and pre-recorded interviews. When Blockbuster Video stopped sponsoring the program in 1999, the show's name was changed to Leeza Gibbons' Top 25 Countdown. In January 2001, the countdown was dropped and the show was renamed Leeza Gibbons' Hollywood Confidential; the show continued until 2013.

In 1998, Gibbons received the Congressional Horizon Award (1998) for her work on children's issues.

In early 2000s, Gibbons launched her mineral makeup line, Sheer Cover Studio, with Guthy-Renker.  Sheer Cover continues to be sold around the world.

In 2005, Gibbons received the Public Leadership in Neurology Award from the American Academy of Neurology for raising awareness about Alzheimer's disease.

On November 14, 2007, California Governor Arnold Schwarzenegger announced the appointment of Gibbons to the board that oversees California's stem cell research agency, filling a slot designated for a patient advocate for Alzheimer's. Her nonprofit group, Leeza's Place,  is aimed at caregivers for persons with memory disorders. Her efforts to raise attention for memory disorders grew out of her own family's experience with her mother, who was diagnosed with Alzheimer's disease and died in May 2008.

Gibbons replaced Meredith Vieira for a week of Who Wants to Be a Millionaire shows on June 23–27, 2008.

In May 2009 Gibbons' new book, Take Your Oxygen First: Protecting Your Health and Happiness While Caring for a Loved One with Memory Loss, tells the story of Leeza's family's personal struggle with Alzheimer's disease after her mother's diagnosis.

In 2013, Gibbons won a Daytime Emmy Award for Outstanding Lifestyle/Travel Host for the PBS series My Generation. In 2015, she won the NBC reality game-show series Celebrity Apprentice.

She began co-hosting the Rose Parade on January 2, 2017. In 2015, Gibbons received the Icon award from the Electronic Retailing Association, where it was announced that Gibbons had crossed the $1 billion mark in sales. Her partnership with Guthy-Renker is the longest studio/talent relationship in infomercial history.

Personal life
Gibbons has been married four times; she was married to John Hicks from 1980 to 1982. From 1989 to 1991, she was married to British actor Christopher Quinten, whom she met when they both participated in the 1988 New Zealand Telethon. She and Quinten have a daughter, Jordan Alexandra (Lexi) Gibbons. Leeza Gibbons was married to actor Stephen Meadows from 1991 to 2005, and they have two sons, Troy and Nathan Daniel. In 2011, she married New York Times best selling author, Steven Fenton, in Beverly Hills. Fenton is the son of the former mayor of Beverly Hills, Frank M. Fenton.

Gibbons is a member of Hollywood United Methodist Church, and all of her children were baptized there.

Her grandmother and mother have been diagnosed with Alzheimer's disease.

References

External links

Leeza's Care Connection

1957 births
American infotainers
American radio personalities
American television talk show hosts
Daytime Emmy Award winners
Living people
Participants in American reality television series
People from Columbia, South Carolina
People from Hartsville, South Carolina
People from Irmo, South Carolina
American United Methodists
University of South Carolina alumni
The Apprentice (franchise) winners